The University of Miami Alma Mater, titled Alma Mater: Stand Forever, is the official alma mater of the University of Miami in Coral Gables, Florida.

History 
The words were written by William Seth Lampe, a newspaper reporter and public relations assistant to Bowman Foster Ashe, the first president of the University of Miami, with music by pianist Christine Asdurian, one of 646 students enrolled at the University of Miami in its first academic year of 1926–27. 

Since then, the alma mater has been sung by fans at Miami Hurricanes sporting events, performed at University of Miami Commencement exercises, university presidential inaugurations, and performed at other major University of Miami events.

Lyrics

References

External links
"University of Miami alma mater" at YouTube
"University of Miami alma mater" performed at 2016 University of Miami Commencement at YouTube
"Alma Mater Stand Forever" at "News @ The U," University of Miami website
University of Miami alma mater sheet music at Band of the Hour Association

Alma Mater
American college songs
Alma mater songs
Miami Hurricanes
Institutional songs